Hockley is a surname. Notable people with the surname include:

 Cal Hockley (1931–2020), Canadian ice hockey player
 Debbie Hockley (born 1972), former New Zealand cricketer
 Fred Hockley (1923–1945), English fighter pilot
 George Washington Hockley (1802–1852), Texas revolutionary
 James Hockley (born 1979), English cricketer
 Matthew Hockley (born 1982), English footballer
 Wayne Hockley (born 1978), English former professional footballer

Fictional characters:
 Caledon Hockley, a fictional character in Titanic

See also
 Anthony Farrar-Hockley (1924–2006), British soldier and military historian
 Dair Farrar-Hockley (born 1946), retired Major General in the British Army